Neil Joseph Linehan (September 23, 1895 – August 23, 1967) was a U.S. Representative from Illinois.

Biography
Linehan was born in Chicago, Illinois on September 23, 1895, the son of Cornelius J. Linehan and Nancy Ann (McNulty) Linehan. He attended the public schools of Chicago, graduated from John L. Marsh School in 1913, and was trained as an electrician.

During World War I, LInehan joined the United States Army and served in France with the 340th Infantry Regiment, a unit of the 85th Division, . After the war, he was active as an electrical contractor and became president of Linehan Electric Company.

Linehan was elected as a Democrat to the Eighty-first Congress (January 3, 1949 – January 3, 1951). He was an unsuccessful candidate for reelection in 1950 to the Eighty-second Congress and for election in 1952 to the Eighty-third Congress. He was Chicago district office of the Director of Price Stabilization in 1951. He later resumed the electrical contracting business.

Linehan died in Chicago on August 23, 1967, and was interred in St. Mary Cemetery.

References
 Retrieved on 2008-01-21

1895 births
1967 deaths
Politicians from Chicago
United States Army personnel of World War I
United States Army soldiers
Democratic Party members of the United States House of Representatives from Illinois
20th-century American politicians